Kire lained is a 1930 Estonian-German action and drama film directed by Vladimir Gajdarov.

Awards, nominations, participations:
 2019: Le Giornate del Cinema Muto Silent Film Festival (Italy, Pordenone), participation

Plot

Cast
 Raimondo Van Riel - Mart Martens
 Ita Rina - Betty, his daughter
 Fritz Greiner - Jaan Kõlgis, king of the spirit
 Hugo Laur - Bratt, his assistant
 Vladimir Gajdarov - Rex Ronney, writer
 Jutta Jol	- Leida, harbour maid
 Hugo Döblin - Feigelbaum, usurer
 Ernst Falkenberg - Raymondo Valdivio
 Ants Eskola

References

External links
 
 Kire lained, entry in Estonian Film Database (EFIS)

1930 films
Estonian action films
German action drama films
Estonian-language films
1930s German films